Věra Klimková (born Věra Leskovjanská on 11 August 1957 in Spišská Nová Ves) is a Slovakian cross-country skier who competed for Czechoslovakia from 1982 to 1988. She finished seventh in the 4 × 5 km relay at the 1988 Winter Olympics in Calgary.

Klimková's best finish at the FIS Nordic World Ski Championships was ninth in the 10 km event at Seefeld in 1985. Her best World Cup career finish was fifth in a 5 km event in Czechoslovakia in 1985.

Cross-country skiing results
All results are sourced from the International Ski Federation (FIS).

Olympic Games

World Championships

World Cup

Season standings

Individual podiums

1 podium

References

External links

Women's 4 × 5 km cross-country relay Olympic results: 1976–2002 

1957 births
Living people
Cross-country skiers at the 1984 Winter Olympics
Cross-country skiers at the 1988 Winter Olympics
Slovak female cross-country skiers
Czechoslovak female cross-country skiers
Sportspeople from Spišská Nová Ves